Caliph Abu Bakr may refer to:

 Abu Bakr al Siddiq of the Rashidun caliphate
 Abu Bakr Atiku of the Sokoto caliphate
 Abu Bakr al-Baghdadi of the Islamic State of Iraq and the Levant